Khalifah Adel Al-Dawsari (born 2 January 1999) is a Saudi Arabian football player who plays as a defender for Pro League club Al-Hilal.

Club
Al-Dawsari started his career in the youth teams of Al-Qadsiah. He was first called up to the first team on 12 April 2018 during the match against Al-Nassr, where he was an unused substitute. On 28 May 2018, he signed his first professional contract with the club. On 29 August 2019, Al-Dawsari renewed his contract with Al-Qadsiah until 2024.

On 7 August 2021, Al-Dawsari joined Al-Hilal on a five-year contract. On 30 January 2022, Al-Dawsari joined Al-Fateh on loan.

Career statistics

Club

Honours

Club
Al-Hilal
Saudi Super Cup: 2021
AFC Champions League: 2021

International
Saudi Arabia U20
AFC U-19 Championship: 2018
Saudi Arabia U23
AFC U-23 Asian Cup: 2022

References

External links
 

1999 births
Living people
People from Khobar
Saudi Arabian footballers
Saudi Arabia youth international footballers
Saudi Arabia international footballers
Association football defenders
Saudi Professional League players
Saudi First Division League players
Al-Qadsiah FC players
Al Hilal SFC players
Al-Fateh SC players
Olympic footballers of Saudi Arabia
Footballers at the 2020 Summer Olympics